Tidiacic is a hepatoprotective drug.  It is a component of tidiacic arginine.

Tidiacic arginine (trade name Tiadilon) is a 1:1 combination of the amino acid arginine and tidiacic (thiazolidine-2,4-dicarboxylic acid), which acts as a sulfur donor.

In France, its indications and use have been described as "identical to those of silymarin".

References

Further reading 

 

Drugs acting on the gastrointestinal system and metabolism
Combination drugs
Dicarboxylic acids
Thiazolidines